Raheen is a townland and village in County Wexford, Ireland.  It lies 27 km from Wexford, 11 km from New Ross, and 23 km from Enniscorthy.

Etymology
Raheen, in Irish  (or simply ), means 'the little rath or ringfort'. A rath or ringfort was a fortified wooden human dwelling.

History
For most of the Norman period, the area was controlled by the Howell family. They gave their name to nearby 'Courthoyle', where they had a chapel and castle.

During the Irish Rebellion of 1798, one of the main rebel camps was located at nearby 'Carrigbyrne Hill'.

Formerly a R.C. church existed at Courthoyle, nearby to the village of Raheen. The current R.C. church of Raheen dates from 1814.

A Protestant church that once existed at the townland of Templeshelin (located about 1 km away) has since been demolished. This belonged to the former Church of Ireland parish of Adamstown. The adjacent cemetery is still in existence and contains some of the victims of the Scullabogue barn fire that took place during the Irish Rebellion of 1798, as well as a small number of other graves.

Amenities 
Raheen village contains a primary school, a shop, a Roman Catholic church, a childcare centre, a community centre, and a few houses. There is also a cemetery located about half a kilometre away at Courthoyle. Raheen Roman Catholic (R.C.) church, a curacy, is part of the R.C. Parish of Newbawn. The parish church is located at Newbawn.

Sport 
The local GAA club is Adamstown GAA Club. The club's main pitch is located at Adamstown, about 3–4 km away. However, there is another pitch located at Newbawn that is sometimes also used. Rounders is also played in Raheen. Raheen school is involved in many sports.

See also
 List of towns and villages in Ireland

References

Sources
Dickson, Charles. The Wexford Rising in 1798. London: Constable & Co., 1997. .
Brooks, Eric St. John. Knights’ Fees in Counties Wexford, Carlow and Kilkenny (13th-15th century). Dublin: Stationery Office, 1950.

Towns and villages in County Wexford
Townlands of County Wexford